Shedbal is a town in the southern state of Karnataka, India. It is located in the Kagwad taluk of Belagavi district in Karnataka. Shedbal is very close to Sangli Miraj twin cities.

Government of Karnataka declared Shedbal Village Panchayat as Shedbal Pattan Panchayat (town panchayat).

Demographics
 India census, Shedbal had a population of 15,278 with 7752 males and 7526 females.

There is a famous Jain Ashram.

The Shanthinatha Jain temple of Shedbal was built in the year 1292 A.D.
It is the birthplace of the well known Jain ascetic Elacharya Paramapujya Muni Sri 108 Vidyananda Maharaj.
Under the guidance of Paramapujya Muni Sri Shanthisagar Maharaj Shanthisagar Chatra Ashram was built.
The Chaturvamshathi tirthankara mandir with the 24 tirthankaras was built in 1952.
Other temples we found here are,
the temples of Bhagawan Adinatha and Bhagawan Mahavira (built in the year 1942 AD),
Sri Bahubali Mandir (built in the year 1960 AD), 
Samavasarana mandir (built in the year 1989 AD)

Shedbal Town Devata Is Shri Basaveshwara.

Shedbal [591315] belongs to Kagwad taluk (distance 4 km)
Shedbal is well connected by rail and road network.
Shedbal is well connected to Miraj in north, Ugar in south, Athani in east and Chikkodi in west.

Shedbal has more than 13,600 acres of agricultural land and in that more than 12,000 and acres is irrigated and 1600 acre land is dependent on rain. Main crops of Shedbal are Sugarcane, Banana, Brinjal, Turmeric, Sunflower, Wheat and other commercial crops.

Major population of Shedbal are followers of Jainism.

Transportation
Shedbal is well connected with places like Athani, Miraj, Sangli, Gokak, Chikkodi, Ugar, Raybag and Belagavi, Shedbal Railway Station lies on Miraj Belagavi Londa route.
Daily five pairs of passenger trains halt at this station, connecting with Belagavi and Miraj

See also
 Belagavi

References

External links
 http://Belgaum.nic.in/

Villages in Belagavi district